Papaipema nelita, the coneflower borer, is a species of cutworm or dart moth in the family Noctuidae. It is found in North America.

The MONA or Hodges number for Papaipema nelita is 9502.

References

Further reading

 
 
 

Papaipema
Articles created by Qbugbot
Moths described in 1898